Febri Setiadi Hamzah (born 3 December 1984) is an Indonesian former footballer who last played as a forward for Liga 3 club Serpong City.

External links 
 

Indonesian footballers
1984 births
Living people
Liga 1 (Indonesia) players
Association football forwards
Borneo F.C. players